Costarainera is a comune (municipality) in the Province of Imperia in the Italian region Liguria, located about  southwest of Genoa and about  southwest of Imperia.

Costarainera borders the following municipalities: Cipressa and San Lorenzo al Mare.

Demographic evolution

References

Cities and towns in Liguria